Henrietta "Harriet" Pelham-Holles, Duchess of Newcastle upon Tyne and Duchess of Newcastle-under-Lyne (1701 – 17 July 1776), was the wife of British statesman and prime minister Thomas Pelham-Holles, 1st Duke of Newcastle.

She was the daughter of Francis Godolphin, 2nd Earl of Godolphin, and Henrietta Churchill, 2nd Duchess of Marlborough. She was also the granddaughter of Sidney Godolphin, 1st Earl of Godolphin, as well as John Churchill, 1st Duke of Marlborough, and Sarah Churchill, Duchess of Marlborough.

Until her marriage, she was known as Lady Harriet Godolphin. Like her husband, she was a devoted Whig and supporter of the Hanoverian succession. They married on 2 April 1717.

During the 1720s, they became famous for throwing sumptuous parties, a tradition that continued for several decades. These were attended even by her husband's political opponents.

References

 Browning, Reed. The Duke of Newcastle. Yale University Press, 1975.
 Field, Ophelia. The Kit-Cat Club: Friends who Imagined a Nation. Harper Collins, 2008.

Spouses of prime ministers of the United Kingdom
1701 births
1776 deaths
Harriet
British duchesses by marriage
English political hostesses
Daughters of British dukes
Daughters of British earls
Whigs (British political party)

fr:Henrietta Godolphin (Pelham-Holles)